Teplička is a village and municipality in the Spišská Nová Ves District in the Košice Region of central-eastern Slovakia.

History
In historical records the village was first mentioned in 1328.

Geography
The village lies at an altitude of 538 metres and covers an area of 7.735 km².
It has a population of about 1115 people.

External links
http://en.e-obce.sk/obec/teplicka/teplicka.html
http://www.statistics.sk/mosmis/eng/run.html
http://www.teplicka.sk

Villages and municipalities in Spišská Nová Ves District